Mary Eastman may refer to:
Mary F. Eastman (1833–1908), American educator, lecturer, writer, suffragist
Mary Henderson Eastman (1818–1887), American writer on Native American life